The banded rubber frog (Phrynomantis bifasciatus) is a species of frog in the family Microhylidae.
It is found in central and southern Africa.
Its natural habitats are dry savanna, moist savanna, subtropical or tropical dry shrubland, subtropical or tropical moist shrubland, subtropical or tropical dry lowland grassland, subtropical or tropical seasonally wet or flooded lowland grassland, subtropical or tropical high-altitude grassland, intermittent freshwater lakes, intermittent freshwater marshes, arable land, pastureland, water storage areas, ponds, and canals and ditches. The female can reach a maximum size of 65 mm whereas the 
tadpoles can reach a size of 37 mm. The maximum size of the male is yet unknown, but sizes differ from 45 mm to 68 mm.

Characteristics: Greyish underside with white spots (sometimes not apparent). Skin is smooth and rubbery. Arms and legs have reddish spots. To distinguish between gender, the male has a darker throat.

Toxicity 
These frogs release a milky toxic substance through their skin. This substance is toxic both to other frog species and humans.

Captivity
This species of Microhylid is kept in captivity.

References
 Prof.S.Jansen, Tuks, University of Pretoria,E. 2012.
 Van den Berg, B. Photo of Red Banded Rubber Frog, 2005

Phrynomantis
Amphibians described in 1847
Taxonomy articles created by Polbot